Loma is a city in Cavalier County, North Dakota, United States. The population was 10 at the 2020 census.  Loma was founded in 1905.

Geography
Loma is located at  (48.637896, -98.525406).

Despite the small number of residents, Loma and nearby Alsen each cover approximately as much land within their corporate boundaries as Minot.

Demographics

2010 census
As of the census of 2010, there were 16 people, 7 households, and 3 families residing in the city. The racial makeup of the city was 100.0% White.

There were 7 households, of which 28.6% had children under the age of 18 living with them, 28.6% were married couples living together, 14.3% had a female householder with no husband present, and 57.1% were non-families. 57.1% of all households were made up of individuals, and 28.6% had someone living alone who was 65 years of age or older. The average household size was 2.29 and the average family size was 4.00.

The median age in the city was 43 years. 25% of residents were under the age of 18; 12.6% were between the ages of 18 and 24; 12.5% were from 25 to 44; 31.3% were from 45 to 64; and 18.8% were 65 years of age or older. The gender makeup of the city was 56.3% male and 43.8% female.

2000 census
As of the census of 2000, there were 21 people, 9 households, and 7 families residing in the city. The population density was 0.8 people per square mile (0.3/km2). There were 10 housing units at an average density of 0.4 per square mile (0.1/km2). The racial makeup of the city was 100.00% White.

There were 9 households, out of which 11.1% had children under the age of 18 living with them, 55.6% were married couples living together, 11.1% had a female householder with no husband present, and 22.2% were non-families. 22.2% of all households were made up of individuals, and none had someone living alone who was 65 years of age or older. The average household size was 2.33 and the average family size was 2.71.

In the city, the population was spread out, with 19.0% under the age of 18, 4.8% from 18 to 24, 19.0% from 25 to 44, 19.0% from 45 to 64, and 38.1% who were 65 years of age or older. The median age was 58 years. For every 100 females, there were 110.0 males. For every 100 females age 18 and over, there were 112.5 males.

The median income for a household in the city was $63,750, and the median income for a family was $63,750. Males had a median income of $43,750 versus $18,750 for females. The per capita income for the city was $18,245. None of the population and none of the families were below the poverty line.

References

Cities in Cavalier County, North Dakota
Cities in North Dakota
Populated places established in 1905
1905 establishments in North Dakota